Pouteria arguacoensium is a species of plant in the family Sapotaceae. It is endemic to Colombia.

References

arguacoensium
Endemic flora of Colombia
Vulnerable plants
Taxonomy articles created by Polbot
Taxa named by Charles Baehni
Taxa named by Gustav Karl Wilhelm Hermann Karsten